Alan "Lefty" Thomas Clarke (March 8, 1896 – March 11, 1975)
He recorded one strike out while surrendering 7 runs (3 earned) on seven hits and two walks.
He was born in Clarksville, Maryland and died at the age of 79 in Cheverly, Maryland.

External links

1896 births
1975 deaths
People from Howard County, Maryland
Major League Baseball pitchers
Cincinnati Reds players
Martinsburg Blue Sox players
Martinsburg Champs players
Rochester Colts players
Waynesboro Red Birds players
Waynesboro Villagers players
Baseball players from Maryland